The Operational Support Command Land (Dutch: Operationeel Ondersteuningscommando Land, OOCL) is a support command of the Royal Netherlands Army. The command consists of multiple combat support and combat service support units that provide the army with a broad variety of services. The OOCL was established in 2009, with the simultaneous disbandment of 1 Logistics Brigade (1 Logistieke Brigade) and 101 Combat Support Brigade (101 Gevechtssteunbrigade).

Units

Command & Control Support Command 
The Command & Control Support Command (Command & Control Ondersteuningscommando, C2OstCo), is based in Stroe and provides the army with all types of communications. The command consists of three signal companies and the Signals Service School:
 Command & Control Support Command
 A; B and C Signal Company
 Signals Service School

Joint ISTAR Command 
The Joint ISTAR Command (Joint ISTAR Commando, JISTARC) is based in 't Harde, and is tasked with collecting, analysing and sharing intelligence. The command consist of the following units:
 Joint ISTAR Command
 Staff Squadron (Stafeskadron)
 102 Electronic Warfare Company (102 Elektronische Oorlogsvoering compagnie)
 104 JISTARC Reconnaissance Squadron (104 JISTARC Verkenningseskadron), with Fennek light armoured reconnaissance vehicles
 105 Field HUMINT Squadron (105 Field Humint-eskadron)
 106 Intelligence Squadron (106 Inlichtingeneskadron)
 107 Aerial Systems Battery (107 Aerial Systems Batterij), with RQ-11B DDL Raven, Q-27 ScanEagle, RQ-21A Integrator unmanned aerial vehicles
 108 Technical Exploitation Intelligence Company (108 Technical Exploitation Intelligence-compagnie)
 109 Open-source Intelligence Company (109 Open Sources Intelligence-compagnie)

Fire Support Command 
The Fire Support Command (Vuursteun Commando, VustCo) is based in 't Harde, and is responsible for providing the Dutch armed forces with ground-based fire support. The command consists of the following units:
 Fire Support Command
 41 Artillery Battalion (41 Afdeling Artillerie)
 Headquarters Battery (Stafbatterij)
 A and B Battery, each with 8x Panzerhaubitze 2000 self-propelled howitzers
 C Battery, with 12x MO-120-RT towed mortars
 D Battery, with 4x Panzerhaubitze 2000 self-propelled howitzers (and 10x stored as reserve)
 Fire Support School (Vuursteunschool)
 Artillery Fire Range (Artillerieschietkamp)

1 Civil-military Interaction Command 
The 1 Civil-military Cooperation Command (1 Civiel en Militair Interactiecommando) is based in Apeldoorn, and is specialised in various forms of interactions between the army and non-military parties, such as local populations and NGOs. The command is specialisied in the following disciplines:
 1 Civil-military Cooperation Command 
 Culture and Education
 Public governance
 Infrastructure
 Human Rights and Healthcare
 Economy, Employment, Agriculture and Cattle
 Development of Small Businesses

Supply and Transport Command 
The Supply and Transport Command (Bevoorrading en Transport Commando) is based in Stroe, and is tasked with the supply and transport for missions, exercises and foreign deployments. The command consist of the following units:
 Supply and Transport Command 
 Staff Company (Stafcompagnie)
 110 and 220 Transport Company (Transportcompagnie)
 130 and 230 Base Company (Clustercompagnie)
 140 Heavy Transport Company (140 Zwaar Transportcompagnie)
 210 Regional Transport Company (210 Regionale Vervoerscompagnie)
 240 Service Company (240 Dienstencompagnie)

101 Engineer Battalion 
The 101 Engineer Battalion (101 Geniebataljon) is based in Wezep, and is tasked with the construction and maintenance of military infrastructure such as roads, buildings and bridges. The battalion consists of the following units:
 101 Engineer Battalion 
 101 Staff Company (101 Stafcompagnie)
 102 and 103 Construction Company (Constructiecompagnieën)
 105 Hydraulic Engineer Company (105 Geniecompagnie Waterbouw)

400 Medical Battalion 
The 400 Medical Battalion (400 Geneeskundig Bataljon) is based in Ermelo, and provides medical services to the Dutch armed forces. The battalion consists of the following units:
 400 Medical Battalion
 Staff and Support Company (Staff & Ondersteuningscompagnie)
 420; 421; 422 and 423 Hospital Company (Hospitaalcompagnie)

Defence Explosive Ordnance Disposal Service 
The Defence Explosive Ordnance Disposal Service (Explosieven Opruimingsdienst Defensie) is based in Soesterberg, and is responsible for land and maritime explosive ordnance disposal. The service consists of the following units:
 Defence Explosive Ordnance Disposal Service 
 Ground-based Company (Grondgebonden compagnie)
 Maritime Company (Maritieme compagnie)
 Research Institute (Kenniscentrum)
 EOD School (EOD-school)

Land Forces Command Staff Support Group  
The Land Forces Command Staff Support Group (Ondersteuningsgroep CLAS) is based in Arnhem, and comprises various support and ceremonial units. The group consists of the following elements:
 Land Forces Command Staff Support Group
 Royal Military Band "Johan Willem Friso" (Koninklijke Militaire Kapel "Johan Willem Friso)
 Regimental Fanfare Garde Grenadiers en Jagers (Regimentsfanfare Garde Grenadiers en Jagers)
 Mounted Units Regimental Fanfare (Regimentsfanfare Bereden Wapens)
 National Reserve Korps Fanfare (Fanfare Korps Nationale Reserve)
 Honorary Cavalry Escort (Cavalerie Ere Escorte)
 Defense Geography Service (Dienst Geografie Defensie)
 Military Penitentiary Center (Militair Penitentiair Centrum)(in Stroe)
 Individual Transmission Office - Security Sector Reform (Bureau Individual Uitzendingen - Security Sector Reform)
 Internal Security Service (Interne Dienstverlening)
 Military Court (Militaire Rechtbank)

References 

Brigades of the Netherlands
Royal Netherlands Army